London Bees is an English women's football club affiliated with Barnet F.C. They play in the FA Women's National League South. The club has been in existence under several names since 1975, originally being called District Line Ladies F.C.. The team were re-branded as London Bees after joining the new WSL 2 for the 2014 season. The club have a first team and a youth academy; both train and play at the Hive Stadium.

History
The club began in 1975 as District Line Ladies FC, then merged with Wembley FC in 1993 to become Wembley Ladies FC. In 1997 the club moved to play at Hanwell Town FC but kept the Wembley Ladies name. In 1998, the club became affiliated with Barnet FC, amalgamating with the existing Barnet Ladies FC from the Greater London League to form Barnet FC Ladies.

In March 2010 Barnet F.C. Ladies were announced as an unsuccessful bidder for the FA Women's Super League. In 2013, they were successful in their bid to join the WSL under their new name of London Bees for the 2014 season.

In the 2016 FA WSL summer season, London Bees became the first WSL 2 club to reach the semi-finals of the FA WSL Cup, after notable wins against Chelsea Ladies on penalties and Sheffield Ladies in their quarter-final fixture. They were later defeated in the semi-final by Birmingham City Ladies.

In the 2020–21 season, London Bees finished bottom of the Championship and were relegated to the third tier of English women's football.

Current squad

Current technical staff

Notable former players
Players who played for District Line Ladies, Wembley Ladies, Barnet FC Ladies or London Bees and received recognition at full international level 

  Evdokia Popadinova
  Natasha Dowie
  Carol Harwood
  Lesley Higgs
  Kim Jerray-Silver
  Justine Lorton
  Kristy Moore
  Danielle Murphy
  Sarah Reed
  Kelly Smith
  Emma Beckett
  Jemma Connor-Iommi
  Jan Mooney
  Ayala Liran
  Naz Ball
  Eleri Earnshaw
  Sydney Hinchcliffe
  Danielle Oates
  Sally Wade
  Laura-May Walkley
  Ruesha Littlejohn
  Rachel Unitt
  Charlie Estcourt
  Helen Ward

Former managers

Honours 
 FA Women's Premier League Southern Division:
 Winners (2): 1992–93 (as District Line), 2009–10 (as Barnet F.C. Ladies)
 FA Women's Premier League Cup:
 Winners (2): 1995–96 (as Wembley Ladies)
, 2010–11
 FA WSL Cup:
 Semi-Finalist: 2016, Continental Cup

Player honours 
  FA WSL 2 Golden Boot Award
 Winner: Jo Wilson with 10 League goals in 2016
    FA WSL 2 Player of the Month (April 2017/18)
   Winner:   Katie Wilkinson 
    FA Championship Player of the Month (January 2019/20)
   Winner:   Sarah Quantrill

Manager honours 
  LMA Women's Championship Manager of the Month (September 2019/20)
 Winner: Lee Burch
  LMA Women's Championship Manager of the Month (January 2019/20)
 Winner: Lee Burch

References

External links
Official site

 
Women's football clubs in England
Ladies
Women's football clubs in London
1975 establishments in England
Women's Championship (England) teams
FA Women's National League teams